Zoran Prljinčević (Serbian Cyrillic: Зоран Прљинчевић; 27 January 1932 – 13 June 2013) was a Serbian footballer and football coach.

References

External links

1932 births
2013 deaths
Sportspeople from Pristina
Kosovo Serbs
Yugoslav footballers
Red Star Belgrade footballers
Association football forwards